Jason H. Moore is a translational bioinformatics scientist, biomedical informatician, and human geneticist, the Edward Rose Professor of Informatics and Director of the Institute for Biomedical Informatics at the Perelman School of Medicine at the University of Pennsylvania, where he is also Senior Associate Dean for Informatics and Director of the Division of Informatics in the Department of Biostatistics, Epidemiology, and Informatics.

Biography 
He was a founding Director of the Advanced Computing Center for Research and Education at Vanderbilt University from 2000 until 2004 and founding Director of the Institute for Quantitative Biomedical Sciences at Geisel School of Medicine of Dartmouth College from 2010 until 2015.

He's the editor-in-chief of the BioData Mining journal since 2008.

Research 
Moore's research focuses on the development and application of artificial intelligence and machine learning methods for modeling complex patterns in biomedical big data. A central focus is using informatics methods for identifying combinations of DNA sequence variations and environmental factors that are predictive of human health and complex disease.  For example, he developed the multifactor dimensionality reduction (MDR) machine learning method for detecting and characterizing combinations of attributes or independent variables that interact to influence a dependent or class variable. He then applied MDR for improved understanding of the interplay of multiple genetic polymorphisms of complex traits in genome-wide association studies. More recent work focuses on computational methods such as the tree-based pipeline optimization tool (TPOT) for automated machine learning and data science. Current work also focuses on methods and software for accessible artificial intelligence.

He is a former member of the National Library of Medicine grant review committee (BLIRC).  He is the founding Editor-in-Chief of the journal BioData Mining. He has published more than 500 peer reviewed articles, book chapters and editorials. His translational bioinformatics research program has been continuously funded by multiple grants from the National Institutes of Health for nearly 20 years.

Honors 
In 2011 he was elected as a Fellow of the American Association for the Advancement of Science (AAAS) and was selected as a Kavli Fellow of the National Academy of Sciences (NAS) in 2013. In 2015 he was elected a Fellow of the American College of Medical Informatics (ACMI). In 2017 he was elected a Fellow of the American Statistical Association (ASA). In 2021 he was elected a Fellow of the International Academy of Health Sciences Informatics (IAHSI). In 2021 he was elected a Member of the International Statistics Institute (ISI).

References

External links
 Jason H. Moore's personal web page
 Jason H. Moore's research laboratory at the University of Pennsylvania
 Jason H. Moore's software on Github
 Jason H. Moore's automated machine learning web page
 Jason H. Moore's retrocomputing blog
 

Living people
Health informaticians
University of Michigan alumni
Dartmouth College
Florida State University alumni
Vanderbilt University faculty
University of Pennsylvania faculty
American bioinformaticians
Fellows of the American Statistical Association
Year of birth missing (living people)
Perelman School of Medicine at the University of Pennsylvania faculty